Yahoo! Travel was a website operated by Yahoo! that offered guide books, daily articles, and travel booking services.

History
The site was launched in 1997.

In May 2007, additional features were added.

In January 2014, it was the 9th-largest travel booking website.

In February 2016, the website was shut down.

References

Web Map Services
Travel
Defunct American websites